Pituca may refer to:
Pituca (footballer, born 1978), Claussio dos Santos Dimas 
Diego Pituca, Brazilian footballer born 1992